Otto Goritz (June 8, 1872 - April 13, 1929) was a German baritone with the Metropolitan Opera from 1903 to 1917. He then sang for the Hamburg State Opera.

Biography
Goritz was born in 1872 in Berlin, Germany. Trained only by his mother, Olga Neilitz Goritz, Goritz debuted as Matteo in "Fra Diavolo" in 1895 at the Court Theatre in Neustrelitz, then sang at opera houses in Breslau and Hamburg.

In 1903, Goritz immigrated to the United States, where he sang with the Metropolitan Opera in New York City from 1903 to 1917. He performed in 25 roles at the Metropolitan, 24 of them in German and 1 in Italian. After the USA entered World War I in 1917, the Metropolitan Opera  suspended performances of works from the German repertory. Goritz nevertheless remained in New York City. In late 1919, he organized the Star Opera Company and tried to stage German operas in German at the Lexington Opera House in New York City. After the American Legion gathered 23,000 signatures in protest and a riot broke out on opening night, the company was forced to disband. In 1920, Goritz returned to Germany, where he continued to sing with the Hamburg State Opera. He died on April 13, 1929 in Hamburg.

Recordings
In the 1910s, Goritz made a number of recordings for Columbia Records, Edison Records, the Victor Talking Machine Company, and other companies. Some of them are available today on compact disc.

References

German operatic baritones
1873 births
1929 deaths
20th-century German male opera singers
Emigrants from the German Empire to the United States